Midwest Tape LLC is a full-service distributor serving the public library sector. The company specializes in shelf-ready DVDs, Blu-rays, physical audiobooks, and similar merchandise that libraries can purchase "pre-processed" with the needed bar codes, labels, RFID, and other tags necessary for libraries. The Midwest Tape catalog includes more than 13 million titles.

History 
Midwest Tape LLC was founded in 1989 and is located in Holland, Ohio. Its origins trace back to 1983 in which, John Eldred, the owner of a video rental store "Sights and Sounds" in Toledo, Ohio, was encouraged by a customer to sell used VHS tapes to public libraries. Subsequently, selling VHS tapes to public libraries became a significant part of the "Sights and Sounds" business. Then, in 1989, John Eldred founded Midwest Tape to specifically serve the public library market.

Subsidiaries 
Dreamscape: an audiobook and video production company.

Hoopla digital: a web and mobile platform for accessing digital content through public libraries.

References

1989 establishments in Ohio
Companies based in Ohio
Mass media companies